Angranoceras is an extinct genus of cephalopod belonging to the Ammonite subclass.

Distribution
None cataloged

References

Permian ammonites